James Andrew Jefferson III (born November 18, 1963) is a former American and Canadian football defensive back in the National Football League (NFL) and Canadian Football League (CFL). He played for the Seattle Seahawks of the NFL and the Winnipeg Blue Bombers and BC Lions of the CFL, and also won two Grey Cup championships, one with the Blue Bombers in 1988 and another with the Lions in 1994. Jefferson played college football at Texas A&M-Kingsville.

References

1963 births
Living people
Sportspeople from Portsmouth, Virginia
Players of American football from Virginia
American players of Canadian football
American football defensive backs
Canadian football defensive backs
Texas A&M–Kingsville Javelinas football players
Winnipeg Blue Bombers players
Seattle Seahawks players
BC Lions players